The discography of Amr Diab, an Egyptian popular pop, dance, folk dance singer, consists of 36 studio albums of which several have been well received by critics and fans from AllMusic. He was born on the October 11, 1961 in Portsaid, Egypt. He began singing at age three and at six, he performed the Egyptian national anthem at the July 23rd Festival in Portsaid. He was awarded a guitar by the governor for his performance and his career course was set. After that he was discovered by the great Emad Badawy when he was only 7, he has ten singles, and 41 music videos. He's recognized as one of the most famous Egyptian singers worldwide holding the Guinness world record for Most World Music Awards for Best Selling Middle Eastern Artist with four.

Albums

1985-1995: Delta Sound Records

1996-2003: Alam El Phan Records

2004-2014: Rotana Records

Since 2016: Nay For Media

Other studio albums

Compilations

Music videos

References

External links
 Official website
 Amr Diab at AllMusic
 

Discographies of Egyptian artists